Shewanella aquimarina is a slightly halophilic, Gram-negative, non-spore-forming, rod-shaped and motile bacterium from the genus of Shewanella which has been isolated from water from the Yellow Sea in Korea.

References

External links
Type strain of Shewanella aquimarina at BacDive -  the Bacterial Diversity Metadatabase

Alteromonadales
Bacteria described in 2004